John David Geisel (born January 18, 1955) is an American former professional baseball pitcher. He played in Major League Baseball (MLB) for the Chicago Cubs, Toronto Blue Jays, and Seattle Mariners.

Overview
Dave Geisel graduated from Tonawanda High School in Tonawanda, New York in 1973, and was originally drafted by the Chicago Cubs in the 5th round of the 1973 Major League Baseball Draft.

Geisel made his major league debut with the Cubs on June 13, 1978, at Riverfront Stadium, pitching one relief inning against the Reds without allowing a baserunner. In March 1982, the Cubs traded Geisel to the Toronto Blue Jays to complete an earlier deal in which the Cubs sent a player to be named later to the Blue Jays for pitcher Paul Mirabella.

In the 1983 offseason, Geisel was selected by the Seattle Mariners from Toronto in the 1983 rule 5 draft. He pitched his final major league game on May 18, 1985, at Seattle's Kingdome in a victory over the visiting Baltimore Orioles.

External links

1955 births
Living people
American expatriate baseball players in Canada
Baseball players from Pennsylvania
Calgary Cannons players
Chicago Cubs players
Gulf Coast Cubs players
Iowa Oaks players
Major League Baseball pitchers
Midland Cubs players
Oklahoma City 89ers players
People from Windber, Pennsylvania
Salt Lake City Gulls players
Seattle Mariners players
Syracuse Chiefs players
Toronto Blue Jays players
Wichita Aeros players